The Diversion Hills are a small group of low rock outcrops at the east extremity of Pain Mesa, in Victoria Land, Antarctica. They were named by the southern party of the New Zealand Geological Survey Antarctic Expedition, 1966–67, because the party diverted eastward from their route here to visit Navigator Nunatak. These hills lie situated on the Pennell Coast, a portion of Antarctica lying between Cape Williams and Cape Adare.

References 

Hills of Victoria Land
Pennell Coast